The Clube dos Desportos de Chingale is a Mozambican football club based in Tete. They play in the top division in Mozambican football, Moçambola. Their home stadium is Estádio do Chingale.

The club was originally founded as Futebol Clube de Tete in the 1950s, and was re-named Sporting Clube do Tete in 1964.  In 1981, the club was re-named Clube dos Desportos de Chingale.

Performance in African competitions
CAF Cup: 1 appearance
Best: 1999–00 First Round – Lost against  Étoile du Sahel 11–0 on aggregate

Current squad

References

Football clubs in Mozambique
Tete, Mozambique